Edison Miranda (born January 7, 1981) is a Colombian former professional boxer who competed from 2001 to 2021. He challenged once each for the IBF middleweight and super middleweight world titles, and was considered to be one of the most dangerous contenders at middleweight due to his exceptionally high knockout-to-win percentage.

Early life
Miranda was born in 1981 in Buenaventura, Colombia and was abandoned by his mother when he was one month old. At age 9, a precocious Miranda began a quest to locate his mother. He hitched rides on truck beds over the course of hundreds of miles and was able to find his uncle working at a construction site. His uncle informed him that if he was really the little boy his sister gave away, then he should have a birthmark on his leg whereas Miranda unveiled the 2-inch long circular proof. The man led him to his mother's new home, only to be abandoned again by his mother. By the time he was 12, he was working in the plantain fields. The next year, he had a full-time construction job. By the time he was 14, he was working as a cattle butcher. At age 15, Miranda took up boxing, training for a half-year before starting his amateur career. Miranda won 128 out of 132 fights, winning four Colombian national titles. Miranda won a bronze medal in the 2000 Olympic Trials in Argentina, but failed to qualify for the 2000 Colombian Olympic team.

Professional career

Middleweight 
132 fights later, Miranda became a professional boxer, but his journey was only halfway over. March 2002 saw Miranda's arrival in the Dominican Republic. Having been promised a shot at going to the United States to fight the top middleweight fighters in the world, Miranda continued with what he's best at – fighting – both in and out of the ring. Struggling to make ends meet, left homeless and hungry by an unfair contract, Miranda left the Dominican Republic and returned to Barranquilla on December 24, 2004. With the support of friends, he fulfilled his dream of making it as a boxer in the United States when he signed with Warrior's Boxing Promotions and then had his first American fight in Hollywood, Florida on May 20, 2005. In that fight, Miranda defeated Sam Reese by unanimous decision.

IBF title eliminator 
Miranda fought Howard Eastman on March 24, 2006, at the Seminole Hard Rock Hotel and Casino in Hollywood, Florida. Miranda got off to a slow start but showed his tremendous power when consecutive right hands hurt Eastman in the fifth round. The experienced Eastman survived the round and came back strong by hurting Miranda in the next round. Miranda kept throwing his right hand, and in the seventh, he had Eastman hurt badly with a clean right cross to the jaw, followed by a left uppercut and then a vicious right uppercut that nailed Eastman under the chin. The referee stopped the fight, making Miranda the first man to stop Eastman. The victory made Miranda the mandatory challenger for IBF Middleweight Champion Arthur Abraham.

IBF title fight 
Miranda fought Abraham on September 23, 2006 in Wetzlar, Germany. The fight was not without controversy. After three competitive rounds, Miranda broke Abraham's jaw with a right hand in round four. In round five, Miranda head-butted Abraham on the right side of his face. Abraham was seen turning away hurt with his mouth agape. Referee Randy Neumann stopped the fight and during the five-minute break, the doctor recommended to stop the fight to what he saw as a broken jaw from a legal punch. The referee decided to continue the fight and deducted two points from Miranda. Abraham fought the remainder of the fight with a visibly broken jaw that was grossly swollen at the end of the fight. In the seventh round, Miranda was docked two more points for low blows. Then in the eleventh round, Miranda landed another low blow and the referee took another point from him. Miranda lost the fight by unanimous decision. He would have lost even without the deduction of any points (although by MD only).

Miranda vs. Gibbs, Green 
 
On December 16, 2006, Miranda fought Willie Gibbs in Miami, Florida. Miranda landed a strong right hand that badly hurt Gibbs, causing him to stagger back into the ropes. Miranda then unloaded a volley of punches, concluding with a right hand followed by a left hook that connected flush on Gibbs' chin, sending him down and out in the first round.

On March 3, 2007, Miranda won a unanimous decision over Allan Green at the Roberto Clemente Coliseum in San Juan, Puerto Rico. Green knocked down Miranda with a left hook that landed on Miranda's chin in round eight. Despite that, Miranda dominated most of the fight and knocked Green down twice in the final round. The fight was fought at a catchweight of 162 lbs, foreshadowing Miranda's problems at making weight.

WBC title eliminator 
On May 19, 2007, after losing nearly every round, Miranda was brutally stopped in the seventh round by Kelly Pavlik at the FedEx Forum in Memphis, Tennessee. After getting knocked down the first time in round six, Miranda spit out his mouthpiece, leading to a one-point deduction. It did not help him survive, since he was knocked down again in round six and once more in round seven. Referee Steve Smoger halted the fight with Miranda still down. The fight was a WBC title eliminator with the winner getting a shot at Middleweight champion Jermain Taylor. Pavlik went on to beat Taylor.

Super middleweight
After the loss to Pavlik, Miranda moved up to Super Middleweight and fought Henry Porras on October 30, 2007, at the Seminole Hard Rock Hotel and Casino in Hollywood, Florida. Miranda started out slowly, but soon found both his range and rhythm. Porras was a game opponent in the first two rounds, but as Miranda became more comfortable, he found openings in Porras’ defense. Miranda unloaded a powerful barrage of punches on a defenseless Porras to force the referee to step in and stop the fight in the fifth round.

On January 11, 2008, Miranda viciously knocked out David Banks in the third round at the Seminole Hard Rock Hotel and Casino in Hollywood, Florida. The fight began with two feeling out rounds that saw Miranda use a consistent left jab to set up rights over the top and underneath of Banks' guard. In round three, Miranda landed a big right hand that caused Banks to collapse backwards and fall awkwardly halfway through the ropes. The knockout was named "Knockout of the Year" by ESPN.com's Dan Rafael, and also was accoladed as Ring Magazine Knockout of the Year for 2008.

Rematch with Abraham
On June 21, 2008, at the Seminole Hard Rock Hotel and Casino in Hollywood, Florida, Miranda lost to Arthur Abraham by fourth-round technical knockout. Abraham spent much of the first and second rounds with his gloves high to his head and his back against the ring ropes, while Miranda threw power punches. Abraham blocked many of Miranda's punches, but a low blow drew a warning to Miranda and a brief rest period for Abraham. Abraham began to open up in the third round, landing right and left hands to Miranda's head. About 30 seconds into the fourth round, Abraham landed a clean left hook to the temple that knocked Miranda down. He got to his feet, but was caught by a sweeping left hook that knocked Miranda down again. Abraham ended the fight seconds later with a third left hand to the head that sent Miranda down again, bringing an automatic stoppage via the three-knockdown rule.

Fight with Lucian Bute

On April 17, 2010, Edison Miranda fought Lucian Bute in Montreal, Quebec, at Bell Centre in front of nearly 15000 fans. Miranda lost the first two rounds and he was knocked out during the third round with a solid right uppercut to the jaw. Miranda got back on his feet but the referee decided to stop the fight seconds after.

Professional boxing record

References

External links

1981 births
Living people
Colombian male boxers
Middleweight boxers
Super-middleweight boxers
Colombian emigrants to the United States
Puerto Rican male boxers
American sportspeople of Colombian descent
Cruiserweight boxers
Light-heavyweight boxers
People from Buenaventura, Valle del Cauca
Sportspeople from Valle del Cauca Department